Prephytoene diphosphate is a carotenoid precursor.

Carotenoids
Organophosphates
Cyclopropanes